Careiro is a municipality located in the Brazilian state of Amazonas. Its population was 38,348 (2020) and its area is 6,092 km².

References

Municipalities in Amazonas (Brazilian state)